Phil Norman (born 20 October 1989) is an English athlete specialising in the 3000 metres steeplechase.

He became British champion when winning the 3000 metres steeplechase event at the 2020 British Athletics Championships in a time of 8 min 32.51 secs.
He represented Great Britain at Tokyo Olympic games in 2021.
His personal best is 8:20.12 for 3000m SC , which he ran in Ostrava in 2021.

References

Personal best of 8:20.12 for 3000m SC (Ostrava 2021)

Living people
1989 births
English male steeplechase runners
British male steeplechase runners
British Athletics Championships winners
Athletes (track and field) at the 2020 Summer Olympics
Olympic athletes of Great Britain